Nakahara (written: 中原 or 仲原) is a Japanese surname. Notable people with the surname include:

, Japanese manga artist
Andrews Nakahara (born 1983), Japanese-Brazilian mixed martial artist
, Japanese manga artist
, Japanese poet
, Japanese graphic artist and fashion designer
Kellye Nakahara (born 1950), American actress
, Japanese voice actress and singer
, Japanese shogi player
, Japanese musician, writer and actor
, Japanese singer
Morihiko Nakahara (born 1975), Japanese conductor
, Japanese Zen Buddhist
, Japanese architect
, Japanese composer
, Japanese voice actor
, Japanese footballer
, Japanese film director
, Japanese footballer
, Japanese footballer
, Japanese actor
, Japanese electrical engineer
, Japanese footballer
, Japanese ethnologist

See also
Nakahara-ku, Kawasaki, a ward of Kawasaki, Japan
Nakahara Prize, a prize awarded by the Japanese Economic Association

Japanese-language surnames